The All-Seeing Eye, known to its community of users as ASE, was a game server browser designed by Finnish company UDP Soft. It helped online gamers find game servers. ASE took two years to develop and was introduced as shareware on June 15, 2001.

Despite UDP Soft lacking the marketing power of GameSpy, ASE's popularity grew swiftly and steadily. It was sold to Yahoo! for an undisclosed sum in September 2004.

Yahoo! All-Seeing Eye 
The purchase by Yahoo! was a defensive move against acquisition activity by CNet and others, and a desire on Yahoo!'s part to tap into the hard-core gaming market.  At the time of the acquisition, All-Seeing Eye had over 12M downloads, and was actively used by more than a million gamers per month.   While some mistakenly assumed the acquisition was in some way a move against Xfire, the reality is that Ultimate Arena had only rebranded themselves as XFire a couple of months prior to the ASE acquisition, and announced an impending launch of their product.  Further, instant-messaging-based applications such as XFire at its launch, differed greatly from first-generation server browsing applications such as GameSpy 3D (Arcade is second-generation) and All-Seeing Eye and even Roger Wilco "TF Soldiers".  Subsequently, that gap has been closed.

Months later, XFire was the target of a Yahoo! lawsuit over an alleged patent infringement, partly because Xfire's two primary developers were previously engineers on the Yahoo! Games team, where they had authored a patent (granted to Yahoo!) on messenger-based game play notification. The legal battle was resolved in January 2006 with details of the settlement remaining unknown.

ASE's continued development was limited after Yahoo! acquired it, and at the time of writing there is only an unofficial forum where people can exchange hand-made updates. As a result, scanning for games developed after 2005 became problematic, and although the application's life cycle has been extended by community-developed filters, without a major update to the program's core, ASE had an uncertain future. As a result, many game enthusiasts have since actively boycotted Yahoo services.

In March and April 2008 Yahoo! sent emails to ASE subscribers informing them that ASE will be discontinued as of 15 May 2008 and that a $15 refund will be issued to current subscribers.

ASE has now been officially shut down, including all of their tracking servers. All games that previously used the ASE service will no longer display server listings. Yahoo! now redirects users seeking ASE to GameSpy Arcade, which has since been shut down also.

References

External links 
 The All-Seeing Eye former official site (archive)
 Yahoo's "videogames.yahoo.com" has been turned off for the time being notice (archive)
 Old forum (archive)

2001 software
Discontinued Yahoo! services
Game server browsers
Internet Protocol based network software
Yahoo! acquisitions